Rentchler is a census-designated place in St. Clair County, Illinois, United States.  Its population was 34 as of the 2010 census.

Demographics

References

Census-designated places in St. Clair County, Illinois
Census-designated places in Illinois